Alexander Kruse (February 9, 1888 – March 31, 1972) was an American painter. His work was part of the painting event in the art competition at the 1932 Summer Olympics.

References

1888 births
1972 deaths
20th-century American painters
American male painters
Olympic competitors in art competitions
People from New York City
20th-century American male artists